Etor Daniel Essien (born 5 May 1993) is a Nigerian footballer who plays for Muscat Club in the Oman Professional League.

Club career

Etor Daniel began his youth career with Karamone , the former youth club of Austin Amutu, Akande Abiodun Asimiyu, Oghogho Oduokpe, Razaq Adegbite, Akande Tope. He got the eye of top professional football teams in Nigeria and abroad but finally got transferred into Enyimba Nigeria Premier League mid-season through his representative Ramone Remmie. He scored the winning goal for Enyimba and one of the fantastic goal in the Nigeria Premier League season 2014 against Sunshine Stars F.C.

Etor scored the first goal in the 3-0 home win over Buffles du Borgou FC to give Enyimba their first leg win of the Caf Champions league Cup qualification stage. He had scored 3 goals and 4 goals assist quarter season in all 14 games, he had played as of now 02/06/2015 inclusive Caf Champions League qualification game, Nigeria Federation Cup and Nigeria Premier League season 2015. He won the 2015 Nigeria Premier league season with Enyimba.

Al-Nasr
He first moved out of Nigeria in 2017 to Oman where he signed a one-year contract with Salalah-based Al-Nasr S.C.S.C. He made his Oman Professional League debut on 13 September 2017 in a 2-0 win over Oman Club and assisted the first goal for his side and scored his first goal in the competition on 18 September 2017 in a 2-0 win over Al-Mudhaibi Club.

Muscat Club
In September 2019 it was confirmed, that Etor had joined Omani club Muscat Club.

Club career statistics

International career
In 2012, he was called up to the Nigeria Super Eagles home-based team. He made his first appearance for the senior national team. He was part of the Nigeria U-20 2012 and 2013. He was selected by Nigeria for their 35-man provisional squad for the 2016 Summer Olympics. Etor Daniel played and won with Nigeria team the 2016 Caf All Africa Games tournament and Caf U23 championship 2016 where he wears the jersey no.9

Style of play
He has been described as a complete forward who possesses pace, accurate ball crosses, brilliant passes to assist goals, good positioning, natural finishing as well as the ability to provide assists to target-man (strikers).

References

External links

1993 births
Living people
Sportspeople from Kano
Nigerian footballers
Nigeria international footballers
Nigerian expatriate footballers
Association football midfielders
Niger Tornadoes F.C. players
Akwa United F.C. players
Enyimba F.C. players
Rangers International F.C. players
Al-Nasr SC (Salalah) players
ABS F.C. players
Muscat Club players
Nigeria Professional Football League players
Oman Professional League players
Expatriate footballers in Oman
Nigerian expatriate sportspeople in Oman